Pamela Stirling is a New Zealand journalist and editor. In 2004 she was appointed editor of New Zealand Listener magazine.

Biography 
Stirling was a journalist for the New Zealand Listener for sixteen years before becoming editor in 2004. As a journalist, she received research scholarships to Cambridge and Stanford Universities.

Recognition 
Stirling has won Best Editor – Current Affairs, Business & Trade at the Magazine Publishing Association Awards eight times. In 2019 she also won the Supreme Editor Award.

References 

Living people
Year of birth missing (living people)
New Zealand journalists
New Zealand writers
New Zealand editors
New Zealand women journalists
21st-century New Zealand women writers
New Zealand women editors
Women magazine editors
New Zealand magazine editors